West Brother Island may refer to:

 The Brothers (islands), Hong Kong
 The Brothers (San Francisco Bay), California, USA
 West Brother Island (Alaska), an island of Alaska